Phyllomedusa camba is a species of frog in the subfamily Phyllomedusinae. It is found in Bolivia, Brazil, and Peru.

Its natural habitats are subtropical or tropical moist lowland forests, intermittent freshwater marshes, rural gardens, and heavily degraded former forests.

It is a very common species and the population is stable. Because of the large areas of suitable habitat still available to this species, there are no major threats. Data from 2007, show, in Parque Nacional Manu in Peru, and numerous protected areas in Bolivia, and presumably Brazil were involved in this species' conservation programs.

References

Phyllomedusa
Amphibians described in 2000
Taxonomy articles created by Polbot